The Campeonato Rondoniense Second Division is the second tier of the football league of the state of Rondônia, Brazil.

Clubs 

2021

 Sport Club Genus de Porto Velho
 Clube Atlético Pimentense

List of champions

Titles by team 

Teams in bold stills active.

By city

References 

Rondoniense
Football in Rondônia